Maud Smith may refer to:

Maud Smith, character in Almost a Rescue
Maud Smith, character in Shadazzle
Maud Smith (figure skater) in North American Figure Skating Championships